Who's Laughing Now is the only full-length studio album by American funk metal band L.A.P.D., released in 1991. Songs from the album, along with the tracks from the band's first release, Love and Peace, Dude, also appeared on the 1997 compilation album L.A.P.D.

Track listing

Personnel 
 Richard Morrill – vocals
 James Shaffer – guitar
 Reginald Arvizu – bass
 David Silveria – drums

Additional
 Valerie Hanna – vocals
 Vince Suzuki – saxophone

References

External links
 

1991 albums
L.A.P.D. (band) albums
Funk metal albums